Sisterna is one of eleven parishes (administrative divisions) in the municipality of Ibias, within the province and autonomous community of Asturias, in northern Spain.

Villages and hamlets
 Bao Population 2011 16
 Sisterna Population 2011 16
http://www.ine.es/nomen2/index.do?accion=busquedaAvanzada&entidad_amb=no&codProv=33&codMuni=28&codEC=9&codES=&codNUC=&ordenAnios=DESC&L=1 INE

Parishes in Ibias